Ulmeni is a commune in Buzău County, Muntenia, Romania. It is composed of five villages: Băltăreți, Clondiru, Sărata, Ulmeni and Vâlcele.

References

Communes in Buzău County
Localities in Muntenia